Daniel Meagher (born 25 October 1962) is a Canadian basketball player. He competed in the men's tournament at the 1984 Summer Olympics.

References

External links
 

1962 births
Living people
Basketball players at the 1984 Summer Olympics
Basketball people from Ontario
Canadian expatriate basketball people in the United States
Canadian men's basketball players
1982 FIBA World Championship players
1990 FIBA World Championship players
Chicago Bulls draft picks
Duke Blue Devils men's basketball players
Olympic basketball players of Canada
Sportspeople from Kingston, Ontario
Forwards (basketball)